Foreststorn "Chico" Hamilton (September 20, 1921 – November 25, 2013) was an American jazz drummer and bandleader. He came to prominence as sideman for Lester Young, Gerry Mulligan, Count Basie, and Lena Horne. Hamilton became a bandleader, first with a quintet featuring the cello as a lead instrument, an unusual choice for a jazz band in the 1950s, and subsequently leading bands that performed cool jazz, post bop, and jazz fusion.

Biography

Early life and career 
Foreststorn Hamilton was born in Los Angeles, California, one of three brothers, one of whom was actor Bernie Hamilton.

Hamilton started his career in a band with Charles Mingus, Illinois Jacquet, Ernie Royal, Dexter Gordon, Buddy Collette and Jack Kelso before he had finished high school. Engagements with Lionel Hampton, Slim & Slam, T-Bone Walker, Lester Young, Count Basie, Duke Ellington, Charlie Barnet, Billy Eckstine, Nat King Cole, Sammy Davis Jr., Billie Holiday, Gerry Mulligan and Lena Horne established his career.

Hamilton appeared in You'll Never Get Rich (1941) as part of the backing group supporting Fred Astaire. Hamilton also performed on the soundtrack of the Bing Crosby and Bob Hope film Road to Bali (1952).

Bandleader 
He recorded his first album as leader in 1955 with George Duvivier (double bass) and Howard Roberts (guitar) for Pacific Jazz. In the same year Hamilton formed an unusual quintet in Los Angeles, featuring cello, flute/saxes/clarinet, guitar, bass and drums. The quintet has been described as one of the last important West Coast jazz bands.

The original personnel included flutist/saxophonist/clarinetist Buddy Collette, guitarist Jim Hall, cellist Fred Katz and bassist Jim Aton, who was later replaced by Carson Smith. Hamilton continued to tour, using different personnel, from 1957 to 1960. A version of the quintet including flutist Paul Horn was featured in the film Sweet Smell of Success in 1957 and one including Eric Dolphy appeared in the film Jazz on a Summer's Day (1960), set at the 1958 Newport Jazz Festival.

Hamilton revamped his group in 1961 with Charles Lloyd, Gábor Szabó, George Bohanon and Albert Stinson, playing what has been described as chamber jazz, with "a moderate avant-gardism." The group recorded for Columbia, Reprise and Impulse Records and also recorded the soundtrack for the industrial film Litho in 1962, the first American film to be shown behind the Iron Curtain. Hamilton formed a commercial and film production company in 1965, and went on to score the feature films Repulsion (1965), Mr. Ricco (1975), Coonskin (1975), By Design (1982), the television programs Portrait of Willie Mays and Gerald McBoing-Boing, and scored hundreds of commercials for TV and radio.

In 1986 Hamilton formed his sextet Chico Hamilton and the Young Alto's featuring Kenneth Lampl, Eric Person and Marc Bernstein.  The group performed at the 1986 JVC Jazz Festival, the Apollo Theater, and Lincoln Center for the Performing Arts.

Later career 
In 2001, Hamilton released Foreststorn featuring Euphoria with Cary DeNigris on guitar, Paul Ramsey on bass, Eric Lawrence on alto and soprano saxes and Evan Schwam on tenor sax, alongside other guest appearances. In August of that year, he performed My Funny Valentine: A Tribute to Chico Hamilton at Lincoln Center.

In 1997, Hamilton received the New School University Jazz and Contemporary Music Programs' Beacons in Jazz Award in recognition for his "significant contribution to the evolution of Jazz". In 2002, he was awarded the WLIU-FM Radio Lifetime Achievement Award. At the IAJE in NYC January 2004, he was awarded a NEA Jazz Master Fellowship. In December 2006, Congress confirmed the nomination of Hamilton to the President's Council on the Arts. In 2007, he received a Living Legend Jazz Award as part of The Kennedy Center's Jazz in Our Time Festival, as well as being awarded a Doctor of Fine Arts from The New School.

In 2006, Hamilton released Joyous Shout! in celebration of his 85th birthday. In 2007, he released Hamiltonia, sampling his original compositions from the four albums released in 2006. Over the years, Hamilton had a series of dance successes, including his signature song "Conquistadors" from his 1960s Impulse album El Chico, and the Brazilian-influenced song "Strut" from his 1980 Elektra album, Nomad.

In 2002, a track titled "For Mods Only" from his 1966 Impulse! Records album The Dealer, was included on the Thievery Corporation's Sounds from the Verve Hi-Fi. In 2006, Rong Music released the 12-inch vinyl Kerry's Caravan by Mudd and Hamilton, with remixes from Ray Mang. Several remixes of Hamilton's recordings were released in the late 2000s. He released Twelve Tones of Love on Joyous Shout! in 2009. In March 2011, he had a long recording session, resulting in 28 new tracks with his Euphoria group. Following a health setback in 2010, he and the group began weekly rehearsals at Hamilton's Penthouse A; which brought together the material which would comprise Revelation, an 11-track CD, released in 2011.

Death
Hamilton died aged 92 on November 25, 2013, in Manhattan. Hamilton was survived by his daughter (Denise), a brother, a granddaughter and two great-granddaughters. His wife, Helen, and his brother Bernie, an actor who starred in Starsky & Hutch, both died in 2008.

Discography

As leader 
1955: Chico Hamilton Quintet featuring Buddy Collette (Pacific Jazz)
1955: The Original Chico Hamilton Quintet (World Pacific) - released 1960
 1955: Live at the Strollers (Fresh Sound) released 2008
1956: Chico Hamilton Quintet in Hi Fi (Pacific Jazz)
1953-56: Chico Hamilton Trio (Pacific Jazz) 
1957: Chico Hamilton Quintet (Pacific Jazz)
1957: Sweet Smell of Success (Decca) - Film soundtrack
 1957: Delightfully Modern (Jazztone) with the Laurindo Almeida Quartet
1958: South Pacific in Hi-Fi (World Pacific)
1958: Chico Hamilton Trio Introducing Freddie Gambrell (World Pacific)
1958: The Original Ellington Suite (Pacific Jazz) with Eric Dolphy - released 2000
1958: The Chico Hamilton Quintet with Strings Attached (Warner Bros.) 
1958: Gongs East! (Warner Bros.) 
1959: Ellington Suite (World Pacific)
1959: The Three Faces of Chico (Warner Bros.) 
1959: That Hamilton Man (Sesac) 
1960: Bye Bye Birdie-Irma La Douce (Columbia)
1960  The Chico Hamilton Special (Columbia)
1962: Drumfusion (Columbia)
1962: Passin' Thru (Impulse!)
1963: A Different Journey (Reprise)
1963: Man from Two Worlds (Impulse!)
1965: Chic Chic Chico (Impulse!)
1966: El Chico (Impulse!)
1966: The Further Adventures of El Chico (Impulse!)
1966: The Dealer (Impulse!)
1968: The Gamut (Solid State)
1969: The Head Hunters (Solid State)
1970: El Exigente: The Demanding One (Flying Dutchman)
1973: The Master (Enterprise)
1974: Montreux Festival (Stax) - live album shared with Albert King and Little Milton
1975: Peregrinations (Blue Note)
1976: Chico Hamilton and the Players (Blue Note)
1977: Catwalk (Mercury)
1979: Reaching for the Top (Nautilus)
1980: Nomad (Elektra)
1988: Euphoria (Swallow)
1990: Transfusion (Studio West/V.S.O.P.)
1991: Reunion (Soul Note)
1992: Arroyo
1993: Trio!
1993: Dreams Come True (Joyous Shout!) with Andrew Hill - released 2008
1994: My Panamanian Friend (The Music of Eric Dolphy)
1994: Dancing to a Different Drummer (Soul Note)
1998: Complete Pacific Jazz Recordings of the Chico Hamilton Quintet
1999: Timely (All Points Jazz)
2001: Foreststorn
2002: Thoughts Of...
2006: Juniflip (Joyous Shout!)
2006: Believe (Joyous Shout!)
2006: 6th Avenue Romp (Joyous Shout!)
2006: Heritage (Joyous Shout!)
2007: Hamiltonia
2007: Mysterious Maiden (180 gram vinyl LP)
2008: It's About Time EP
2008: Alternative Dimensions of El Chico (Joyous Shout!)
2008: Trio! Live @ Artpark
2009: The Alternative Dimensions of El Chico (12" double vinyl)
2009: Twelve Tones of Love (Joyous Shout!)
2011: Revelation (10" vinyl EP)
2011: Euphoric (EP)
2011: Revelation
2013: The Inquiring Mind (Joyous Shout!)

As sideman
With Louis Armstrong
Louis Armstrong and His Friends (Flying Dutchman/Amsterdam, 1970)
With Buddy Collette
Tanganyika (Dig, 1956)
With Paul Horn 
House of Horn (Dot, 1957) - credited as "Forest Thorn" 
With Fred Katz
Zen: The Music of Fred Katz (Pacific Jazz, 1957)
Soul° Cello (Decca, 1958)
With John Lewis
Grand Encounter (Pacific Jazz, 1956)
With Gerry Mulligan
Gerry Mulligan Quartet Volume 1 (Pacific Jazz, 1952)
Gene Norman Presents the Original Gerry Mulligan Tentet and Quartet (GNP, 1953 [1997])
California Concerts (Pacific Jazz, 1955)
With Ken Nordine
Word Jazz (Dot, 1957) - credited as "Forest Horn"
With Gábor Szabó
Spellbinder (Impulse!, 1966)

References

External links 
 

Chico Hamilton profile, drummercafe.com; accessed July 15, 2015.
Profile, dromnyc.com; accessed July 15, 2015.
 Obituary, theguardian.com, November 26, 2013; accessed July 15, 2015.

 

1921 births
2013 deaths
African-American jazz musicians
American jazz drummers
Cool jazz drummers
Crossover jazz drummers
Hard bop drummers
Jazz-funk drummers
Post-bop drummers
Soul-jazz drummers
West Coast jazz drummers
Jazz musicians from California
Musicians from Los Angeles
20th-century African-American people
21st-century African-American people